Stetson University College of Law (Stetson Law), founded in 1900 and part of Stetson University, is Florida's first law school. Originally located near the university's main campus in DeLand, Florida, the law school moved in 1954 to Gulfport, Florida. The law school occupies a historic 1920s resort hotel, the Rolyat Hotel, designed by Richard Kiehnel. The College of Law is accredited by the American Bar Association and has been a member of the Association of American Law Schools since 1931. The college also has a campus in Tampa, Florida that shares space with a working court, Florida's Second District Court of Appeal.

Academics

Stetson Law currently employs more than 40 full-time faculty members and has more than 900 students enrolled in its Juris Doctor (J.D.) program. The J.D. program offers six concentrations: Advocacy, Business Law, Elder Law, Environmental Law, International Law and Social Justice Advocacy. Stetson also offers advanced legal degrees, including a Master of Laws (LL.M.) with three concentrations: Advocacy, Elder Law and International Law. The law school also offers a Master of Jurisprudence (M.Jur.) with three concentrations: Aging, Law and Policy; Healthcare Compliance; and International and Comparative Business Law. The J.D. degree may be combined with an LL.M or a Master of Business Administration (M.B.A.) with the Stetson University School of Business Administration. The J.D. degree may also be combined with an exchange program: an LL.M. in Exchange in Ireland/England with the University College Dublin Sutherland School of Law, a Master in International Economic Law (MINTEC) with Toulouse University or a Master in International and European Business Law (M.I.E.B.L.) with Comillas Pontifical University.

The school is home to several institutes, centers, programs and initiatives, including: the National Clearinghouse for Science, Technology and the Law; Centers for Excellence in Advocacy, Elder Law and Higher Education Law and Policy; and Institutes for Caribbean Law and Policy and Biodiversity Law and Policy.

Clinics
Stetson Law is one of few U.S. law schools that guarantees a clinic or externship for every student. More than 300 clinic and externship opportunities are available to students each year.

Publications
The Stetson Law Review was the headquarters for the National Conference of Law Reviews from 2003 to 2008. The Journal of International Wildlife Law and Policy and the Journal of International Aging Law and Policy are produced in conjunction with the school.

Rankings
Stetson University is nationally ranked 111th among law schools by U.S. News & World Report. Among specialty rankings, the school tied for second in trial advocacy and tied for fifth in legal writing. Stetson had a 74.4 percent first-time Bar passage rate for takers of the October 2020 Florida Bar Examination. 77.6 percent passed the July 2019 exam, 67.2 percent passed the July 2018 exam and 76.8 percent passed the July 2017 exam.

Competitions
Since 1980, Stetson Law has won five world championships, 79 national championships, 97 regional championships, 53 state championships, 61 brief awards, 176 brief oralist/advocate awards and six professionalism awards.

As of 2021, Stetson Law has won The Florida Bar Trial Lawyers Section of the Chester Bedell Mock Trial Competition 25 times in 38 years.

Stetson Law was the first-ever American Bar Association (ABA) Competitions Champion in 2018 and earned the title for a second time in 2021.

Stetson Law won The Florida Bar Foundation 2021 Florida Pro Bono Law School Challenge.

Law libraries
In order to obtain, and maintain, accreditation through the American Bar Association (ABA), law schools must meet certain standards set by the ABA. The Council and Accreditation Committee of the American Bar Association (ABA) Section of Legal Education and Admissions to the Bar is the accrediting agency for law schools. Among the standards evaluated is the requirement that law schools have a law library. The standards also establish the requirements relative to the administration of the law library, the law library director, personnel, services, and the collection the library shall hold. As such, Stetson University College of Law maintains a main library on the Gulfport campus—the Dolly & Homer Hand Law Library—and a satellite library at the Tampa Law Center.

History of Stetson's law libraries
As the Board of Trustees authorized the establishment of the Stetson University College of Law in 1899, creating a law library immediately became a concern. To create a core collection for the law library, book and monetary donations were sought and obtained from Florida attorneys. By its opening in October 1900, the College of Law had a law library and the 1901 annual report indicated that the library donation goals had been met.

Upon the law school's move from DeLand to Gulfport in 1954, the library collection also had to be moved. The new house for the law library consisted of "several small cubicles" and at the time "all the law books 'fit into one moving van.'" The collection contained less than 18,000 books. In 1955, an anonymous donor pledged $250,000 to assist in paying for the creation of a new law library and classroom building. Within one year, the law school was able to raise the money to match the anonymous donation and met its $750,000 goal. It became known that the anonymous donor was Charles A. Dana and the Charles A. Dana Foundation. Construction on the new Charles A. Dana Library began in 1957. Students and staff transferred the small law library collection from the original location on the Gulfport campus to the new library in less than thirty minutes. This new library included space to expand the collection (housing for 70,000 volumes) and study space for 100 students. In 1958, the Charles A. Dana Law Library opened. The dedication of the library, made in the presence of Charles A. Dana, included a convocation by Florida's Governor, LeRoy Collins. The Charles A. Dana Foundation provided a gift in 1971 for the purpose of doubling the law library's size. The school completed the expansion in 1973 and provided space for 275 students and 160,000 volumes. During this time, the Charles A. Dana Library also became "the first law library in Florida to be a depositary for Federal Government documents." By 1981, the library's collection contained more than 165,182 volumes.

By the mid-1990s, Stetson University College of Law "had been put on notice years earlier that its library was on shaky grounds regarding ABA requirements, and that the problems were of such magnitude that a new structure might have to be built." Some individuals did not believe a new library was warranted as they doubted the future of libraries, but Dean Moody proceeded with the planning stated by her predecessor Dean Bruce Jacob, Emeritus Law Librarian Lamar Woodard, and architect Canerday. In 1998, the new facility, named Stetson Law Library and Information Center, was completed. The new facility provided 58,000 square-feet and had ample accommodation for the current collection (350,000 volumes), as well as "government documents, and other traditional resource materials." United States Supreme Court Associate Justice Ruth Bader Ginsburg spoke at the new library's dedication on September 5, 1998. C-Span provided video coverage of Justice Ginsburg's speech.

In 2004, Stetson University College of Law opened its Tampa Law Center with a satellite library. In 2010, Stetson University College of Law renamed the Stetson Law Library and Information Center for philanthropists Frances R. "Dolly" and Homer Hand. The renaming occurred as part of the College of Law's celebration of its 110 years in existence. Dolly Hand spoke at the naming ceremony, which was captured on video.

Dolly & Homer Hand Law Library
The Dolly & Homer Hand Law Library is situated on the Gulfport campus. When constructed in the late 1990s, the new library was built in the Mediterranean Revival design style to maintain consistency with the style of the buildings comprising the Gulfport campus, which were originally the Rolyat Hotel. Located across the street from the original campus buildings, the Dolly & Homer Hand Law Library contains a collection of approximately 400,000 volumes. The current collection "is above the median size of academic law libraries in the United States." The three-story building offers Internet access, 35 study rooms (ranging in size), and more than 600 seats at individual carrels, tables, and lounge areas.

The library provides services for students, faculty, staff, alumni, attorneys, and the public. Students have 24/7 access to the Dolly & Homer Hand Law Library through use of their swipe cards. The law library employs six professional librarians and seven additional staff members, including the Systems Administrator and members of the Access Management & Services Team.

In addition to its traditional collection of statutes, case reporters, journals, and treatises (both physical and electronic access), the Dolly & Homer Hand Law Library and its librarians also provide LibGuides on a variety of topics, tutorials on researching a variety of sources and using electronic databases, and digital archives including the Harold L. Sebring Collection, the Florida Military Academy Collection and the Hotel Rolyat Collection.

Tampa Law Center Satellite Library
Situated near downtown Tampa, the satellite library has two-floors consisting of approximately 200 seats and 15 study rooms. The satellite library provides a core collection of materials and Internet access. The satellite library also provides services to students, faculty, staff, alumni, attorneys and the public; however, such services are available subject to more limited hours of operation.

Employment
The 2020 ABA employment summary report shows the employment status of 2020 graduates.

Costs
The estimated total cost of attendance (including tuition, fees and living expenses) at Stetson University College of Law for the 2020–2021 academic year is $70,592.

Diversity and inclusion
Stetson Law received the 2020 Higher Education Excellence in Diversity (HEED) Award from INSIGHT Into Diversity magazine, the largest magazine centered on diversity in higher education. The HEED Award recognizes U.S. colleges and universities for outstanding commitment to diversity and inclusion.

As of 2020, Stetson Law and the 11 other Florida law schools formed the Florida Law Schools’ Consortium for Racial Justice (FLSCRJ). This collective will leverage each school's strengths and educational roles to assist community organizations fighting for racial justice and policy reform throughout Florida.

Stetson Law is one of the four co-founding higher education institutions of the St. Petersburg Higher Education Consortium for Racial Justice. The other three consortium institutions are Eckerd College, St. Petersburg College and the University of South Florida St. Petersburg. The consortium serves 36,000 students in St. Petersburg, Florida, and focuses on dismantling racial hierarchies. Recognized for their efforts, the consortium and 78 institutions nationwide were invited to the 2021 American Association of Colleges and Universities Institute on Truth, Racial Healing and Transformation (TRHT) to learn about the TRHT framework and develop an action plan.

In 2021, Stetson Law launched a youth civic education program aimed at teaching underrepresented teens in Pinellas County how to be advocates for themselves and others.

Notable faculty
 Bruce Jacob (see alumni)
Cary D. Landis – 25th Florida Attorney General, (1931–1938)
 Ellen Podgor – expert on white-collar crime
 Harold Sebring – former chief justice of the Florida Supreme Court; a judge at the Nuremberg War Trials; Dean of Stetson Law (1955–1968)
 Bradford Stone, commercial law maven and theorist, Stetson University College of Law Charles A. Dana Professor of Law Emeritus, author of several editions of Uniform Commercial Code in a Nutshell and coauthor of Commercial Transactions Under the Uniform Commercial Code.
 Michèle Alexandre – first Black female dean of Stetson Law
 Ciara Torres-Spelliscy – nationally recognized expert and author on election law and politics
 Louis J. Virelli III – nationally recognized expert and author in constitutional law
 Rebecca C. Morgan – nationally recognized expert in elder law
 Peter F. Lake – nationally recognized expert on higher education
 Luz Estella Nagle – internationally recognized expert in international law, first tenured Hispanic law professor at Stetson Law
 Dorothea Beane – professor emeritus, first tenured African-American female professor of law at Stetson Law, co-founder of the Institute for Caribbean Law and Policy, founder of Stetson Law’s study abroad program at The Hague

Notable alumni

 John Cosgrove – Florida House of Representatives (198?-199?)
 Gus Bilirakis (1989) – Florida House of Representatives (1998); United States House of Representatives (2006)
 Pam Bondi (1990) – Attorney General of Florida
 Susan C. Bucklew (1977) – District Judge for the US District Court for the Middle District of Florida
 Edward Cowart (1952) – Dade County circuit court judge who presided over the Ted Bundy case
 Craig Crawford (1981) – television political commentator, writer, and columnist for the Congressional Quarterly
 Richard E. Doran – Attorney General of Florida while Jeb Bush was Governor
 David W. Dyer – United States District Judge for the Southern District of Florida; Judge for the United States Court of Appeals for the Fifth Circuit; Judge for the United States Court of Appeals for the Eleventh Circuit
 Roy Geiger (1885-1947) – United States Marine Corps General; during World War II, became the first Marine to lead an army
 Bob Gualtieri (born 1961) - sheriff, lawyer, and politician
 Joe Hendricks – United States House of Representatives (1937-1949)
 Carol W. Hunstein (1976) – Chief Justice of the Georgia Supreme Court 
 Bruce Jacob – Florida Assistant Attorney General during the early 1960s and argued the case for the respondent, Louis Wainwright, the losing party in the landmark case Gideon v. Wainwright
 Craig T. James – United States House of Representatives (1989-1993)
 Frederick B. Karl (1949) – Florida Supreme Court Justice
 Elizabeth A. Kovachevich (1961) – District Judge for the US District Court for the Middle District of Florida
 Carl M. Kuttler Jr. (1965) – President of St. Petersburg College, 1978–2009
 Michael William Lebron – Radio broadcaster, "Lionel"
 Kenneth Marra (1977) – Federal judge, United States District Court for the Southern District of Florida
 Rich McKay (1984) – President and general manager of the Atlanta Falcons (2004)
 E. Clay Shaw Jr. (1966) – represented South Florida in the U.S. House of Representatives (1981-2007)
 David Sholtz – twenty-sixth Governor of Florida (1933-1937)
 James C. Smith – Attorney General of Florida
 Roy Speer – co-founder of the Home Shopping Network
 Louie Willard Strum – Florida Supreme Court Justice
 Elwyn Thomas – Florida Supreme Court Justice
 Matt Towery (1987) – national political analyst and pollster, television commentator, syndicated columnist, author, publisher, and attorney
 James D. Whittemore (1977) – District Judge for the US District Court for the Middle District of Florida
 Ashley Moody (2003) – Attorney General of Florida
 Emmett Wilson – United States House of Representatives (1913-1917)
 Chris Sprowls (2009) – Speaker of the Florida House of Representatives (2020-2022)
 Dean Trantalis (1979) – mayor of Ft. Lauderdale, Florida (2018–present)
Bob Gualtieri (2002) – sheriff of Pinellas County, Florida

References

Further reading
 Florida's First Law School: History of Stetson University College of Law (2006) by Michael I. Swygert provides a detailed history of the school covering its founding, development, and growth. .

External links
 

ABA-accredited law schools in Florida
Education in Pinellas County, Florida
Stetson University
Educational institutions established in 1900
Buildings and structures in Pinellas County, Florida
1900 establishments in Florida